John William Bowman (23 April 1879 – 26 January 1943) was an English football player and manager.

He played one cup game for Burslem Port Vale in 1899, having previously appeared for a number of nearby amateur sides. He then spent two seasons with Stoke, playing four games in the Football League, before he joined Queens Park Rangers in 1901. In four years with QPR he played more than 100 matches, before he was selected to serve Norwich City as manager. He stepped down in 1907, returning to the game in 1912 for a four-year stint as Croydon Common manager. He then returned to QPR as a director, though briefly took the managerial reins in 1931.

Playing career
Bowman moved to Staffordshire at a young age and started with Shelton Juniors before moving on to Hanley St. Jude's and Burslem Park, before joining Burslem Port Vale of the Second Division in February 1899. He played at left-half in a 1–1 draw with Walsall in a Birmingham Senior Cup semi-final match on 13 March 1899, but was not selected again. After being released at the end of the season he moved on to their local rivals Stoke. He played two First Division for the "Potters" in both 1899–1900 and 1900–01, before he signed for Queens Park Rangers in June 1901, playing as centre half. He went on to play 103 league games for the Southern League club, scoring two goals.

In addition to playing football, Bowman was also a renowned athlete (a strong runner and swimmer) and was a teetotaller and non-smoker. He married Elsie Ethel Annells at St John's Church, Kensal Green in July 1905.

Management career
After carrying out the role of Club Secretary at Queen's Park Rangers, Bowman was Norwich City's first-ever manager, and was in charge for 78 matches between 1905 and 1907, winning 31, losing 24 and drawing 23 games. He also played several matches for the club.

Bowman is also the first person recorded as referring to the club as "the Canaries". The reference comes in an interview recorded in the Eastern Daily Press with the newly appointed manager in April 1905. The paper quotes him saying "Well I knew of the City's existence... I have... heard of the canaries." Norwich City historian Eastwood notes:

After leaving City he took up the position as manager of Croydon Common before returning to old club QPR as a director and later as team manager. Appointed in May 1930, he had to retire due to ill health in November 1931. Bowman remained in the North West London area and ran a sports shop at 7 Park Parade, Harlesden with branches in Wembley and Marylebone.

Career statistics

Playing statistics

Managerial statistics
Source:

References

External links
 Profile at Croydon Common

Footballers from Middlesbrough
English footballers
Association football defenders
Port Vale F.C. players
Stoke City F.C. players
Queens Park Rangers F.C. players
Norwich City F.C. players
Southall F.C. players
English football managers
English Football League players
Norwich City F.C. managers
Queens Park Rangers F.C. managers
English Football League managers
1879 births
1943 deaths